Précieux is a commune in the Loire department in central France.

Population

Personalities
Benoît Malon (1841 - 1893), politician, journalist was born in Précieux.

See also
Communes of the Loire department

References

Communes of Loire (department)